Syagrus glaucescens is a species of flowering plant in the family Arecaceae. It is endemic to Minas Gerais state in southeastern Brazil. Its small population is threatened by collecting and habitat destruction.

References

glaucescens
Endemic flora of Brazil
Flora of Minas Gerais
Flora of the Cerrado
Vulnerable flora of South America
Taxa named by Odoardo Beccari
Taxonomy articles created by Polbot